Aleksei Olegovich Bobrov (born 25 June 1973) is a former Russian football player.

External links
 

1973 births
Footballers from Saint Petersburg
Living people
Russian footballers
FC Zenit Saint Petersburg players
Russian Premier League players
FC Irtysh Omsk players
FC Rubin Kazan players
FC Moscow players
FK Liepājas Metalurgs players
Russian expatriate footballers
Expatriate footballers in Latvia
Association football midfielders
FC Petrotrest players
FC Dynamo Vologda players
FC Lokomotiv Saint Petersburg players
FC Zenit-2 Saint Petersburg players